Michael Schuler (November 8, 1901 – January 14, 1974) was an American gymnast who competed in the 1932 Summer Olympics. He was born in Würzburg and died in West New York.

References

1901 births
1974 deaths
American male artistic gymnasts
Gymnasts at the 1932 Summer Olympics
Olympic silver medalists for the United States in gymnastics
Bavarian emigrants to the United States
Medalists at the 1932 Summer Olympics